Henri de Raincourt (born 17 November 1948) is a French politician who was Minister for Relations with Parliament (2009-2010) and Minister in charge of Co-operation (2010-2012) during Nicolas Sarkozy’s presidency. Previously a Senator representing the Yonne department, he is set to re-join the Senate in June 2012, a month after leaving the Government.

He was elected Senator for Yonne in 1986, and re-elected in 1995 and 2004; he was Chairman of the Union for a Popular Movement Senate caucus between 2008 and 2009. He has also served as President of the Yonne General Council between 1992 and 2008.

A farmer by profession, Henri de Raincourt is the son of Philippe de Raincourt (1909–1959), Senator for Yonne from 1948 to 1959. He is also a fourth-generation grandson of the Marquis de Sade.

He has been deputy chairman of the UMP since 2013.

Political career

Governmental functions
Minister in charge of Relationships with Parliament: 2009–2010.
Minister in charge of Co-operation under the Minister of Foreign and European Affairs: 2010–2012.

Electoral mandates

Senate of France
Chairman of the Union for a Popular Movement Group in the Senate: 2008–2009.
Chairman of the Republicans and Independents Group in the Senate: 1995–2002. Re-elected in 1998, 2001.
Senator for Yonne : 1986-2009 (Became minister in 2009). Elected in 1986, re-elected in 1995, 2004, 2008.

Regional Council
Regional Councillor of Bourgogne: Since 2010.

General Council
President of the Yonne General Council: 1992–2008. Re-elected in 1994, 1994, 2001, 2004.
Vice President of the Yonne General Council: 1982–1992. Re-elected in 1985, 1988.
General Councillor of Yonne: 1980–2008. Re-elected in 1982, 1988, 1994, 2001.

Municipal Council
Mayor of Saint-Valérien, Yonne: 1977–2001. Reelected in 1983, 1989, 1995.
Municipal Councillor of Saint-Valérien, Yonne: Since 1977. Reelected in 1983, 1989, 1995, 2001, 2008.

Community of Communes Council
President of the Gâtinais-en-Bourgogne Community of Communes Council: Since 2008.
Member of the Gâtinais-en-Bourgogne Community of Communes Council: Since 2008.

References

Page on the Senate website

1948 births
Living people
Union for a Popular Movement politicians
The Republicans (France) politicians
French Senators of the Fifth Republic
Vice-presidents of the Senate (France)
Recipients of St. George's Order of Victory
Senators of Yonne
People from Yonne
Politicians from Bourgogne-Franche-Comté
Government ministers of France